The following lists events that happened during 2010 in Niger.

Incumbents
President: Mamadou Tandja (until February 18), Salou Djibo (starting February 18)
Prime Minister: Ali Badjo Gamatié (until February 18), Mahamadou Danda (starting February 18)

Events

February
 February 18 - A military junta named the Supreme Council for the Restoration of Democracy carries out a coup d'état, suspending the constitution and detaining President Mamadou Tandja.
 February 20 - 2010 Nigerien coup d'état
 The African Union suspends Niger following this week's coup d'état.
 Thousands of people take part in a second day of celebrations in the capital.

April
 April 23 - A Frenchman and his Algerian driver are kidnapped by armed men in Niger.
 April 28 - Niger faces total crop failure worse than that of 2005, according to United Nations Under-Secretary-General for Humanitarian Affairs and Emergency Relief Coordinator John Holmes.

May
 May 21 - Nigeriens flee across the border into Nigeria due to a food crisis in Niger.
 May 24 - Niger proposes reforms that would see only those with a university degree be allowed to run in presidential elections and parliamentary candidates be under the age of seventy and have some form of secondary education. Opposition groups say this discriminates against the 80 per cent of the population that is illiterate.

June
 June 21 - Major aid agencies Oxfam and Save the Children both launch $10 million (£6.7 million) appeals for Niger where drought is common at the moment and half the country has no food.

August
 August 10 - The Niger River bursts its banks forcing 5,000 people to lose their homes and crops.
 August 14 - The United Nations states Niger faces its worst hunger crisis in history, worse than 2005 when thousands of people were left to starve to death.
 August 21 - The charity Save the Children says the food crisis in Niger is being made worse by hoarders selling grain at higher prices than most people can afford.
 August 24 - Oxfam warns of a "double disaster" following flooding compounding a recent drought and food crisis in Niger.

September
 September 20 - France sends dozens of soldiers equipped with Breguet Atlantique and Mirage aircraft to Niamey in its search for 7 kidnapped hostages.
 September 21 - al-Qaeda in the Islamic Maghreb claims responsibility for kidnapping five French workers in Niger.

October
 October 14 - Colonel Abdoulaye Badie, the second in command in Niger's military government, the Supreme Council for the Restoration of Democracy, is arrested.
 October 19 - Salou Djibo sacks his intelligence chief Seyni Chekaraou following the arrest of several members of the ruling Supreme Council for the Restoration of Democracy junta on suspicion of planning a coup d'état.

November
 November 3 - Constitutional referendum results in Niger show that 90% of voters approve a return to civilian rule from the Supreme Council for the Restoration of Democracy military junta.

References

 
Years of the 21st century in Niger
Niger
Niger
2010s in Niger